Norton Folgate is a short length of street in London, connecting Bishopsgate with Shoreditch High Street, on the northern edge of the City of London. 

It constitutes a short section of the A10 road, the former Roman Ermine Street. Its name is a reminder of the tiny ancient Liberty of Norton Folgate situated in and around the area.

The nearest London Underground station is Liverpool Street, also a National Rail mainline railway station. The nearest London Overground station is Shoreditch High Street.

It lends its name to a character played by Samuel Barnett in the ongoing Big Finish Productions Torchwood audio drama series.

In July 2015, more than 500 people protested against the demolition of the old buildings in historic Norton Folgate neighbourhood to make way for new developments. People travelled from across the country to ask for the restoration of the old structures rather than offering them to the international property investment market.

References

External links
2016 Redevelopment of Norton Folgate
2015 Campaign to Save Norton Folgate
Large scale 1885 Map of the Liberty and surrounding area
Hidden London: Norton Folgate
Local administration of Norton Folgate
Tower Hamlets Archives
Survey of London Vol 27: Norton Folgate

Streets in the London Borough of Tower Hamlets
Streets in the London Borough of Hackney
Streets in the City of London